José Antonio Name Terán (5 February 1936 – 5 September 2011) was a lawyer and former Senator of Colombia. Considered a Liberal caudillo, he was one of the longest serving senators in Congress and one of the most influential politicians of the Caribbean Region of Colombia. He also served in Colombia as Minister of Labour, Member of the Chamber of Representatives, and a Deputy to the Atlántico Departmental Assembly.

In 2007 Name ran for Governor of Atlántico as a Party of the U candidate, obtaining 213,270 votes (28.76% of the total) during the Colombian regional elections, but lost against Eduardo Verano De la Rosa.

Personal life
He died in Bogotá, D.C., on 5 September 2011 of a prolonged respiratory tract infection.

See also
 Fuad Ricardo Char Abdala
 Roberto Gerlein Echeverría

References

1936 births
2011 deaths
People from Sincelejo
Colombian people of Lebanese descent
Jose Antonio
20th-century Colombian lawyers
Members of the Chamber of Representatives of Colombia
Colombian Ministers of Labour and Social Protection
Members of the Senate of Colombia
Social Party of National Unity politicians
20th-century Colombian politicians
21st-century Colombian politicians
University of Atlántico alumni